"Be the First to Believe" is the debut single of British-Norwegian boy band A1, released on 21 June 1999 from their debut album, Here We Come (1999). The song peaked at  6 on the UK Singles Chart, becoming the band's first chart entry in the UK.

Track listings
UK CD1
 "Be the First to Believe" – 3:22
 "Miracle" – 3:09
 "Be the First to Believe" (Phats & Small Mutant Disco Mix Part 1) – 6:00

UK CD2
 "Be the First to Believe" – 3:22
 "Be the First to Believe" (Amen club mix) – 8:01
 "A1 Chat Exclusively to You" – 4:24

UK cassette single
 "Be the First to Believe" – 3:22
 "Miracle" – 3:09

Australian CD single
 "Be the First to Believe" – 3:22
 "Be the First to Believe" (Phats & Small Mutant Disco Mix Part 1) – 6:00
 "Be the First to Believe" (Amen club mix) – 8:01
 "Miracle" – 3:09

Charts

References

1999 debut singles
1999 songs
A1 (band) songs
Columbia Records singles
Songs written by Ben Adams
Songs written by Christian Ingebrigtsen
Songs written by Mark Read (singer)
Songs written by Paul Marazzi
Songs written by Peter Cunnah